Pesarattu is a 2015 Telugu language film directed by Mahesh Kathi.

Production
This is the first-ever crowd-funded, crowd-sourced cooperative film in Telugu. Twelve producers contributed to the making of this film.

Plot
Bhavana (Nikitha Narayan) is ready to get engaged but faces some confusion. When the day of betrothal arrives her family cannot find her. The groom Yuvaraj (Nandu) arrives and the family finally locates her.

Cast
 Nandu as Yuvaraj
 Nikitha Narayan as Bhavana
 Appaji Ambarisha Darbha as Bhavana's father
 Sampoornesh Babu (cameo appearance)

Reception
The Times of India noted a film including advertisements as story is one of the perils befalling crowd-funded films in a production's wish to please those who contributed. In analyzing the plot and storyline, while appreciative of the actors they felt the film was overall "pathetic".  However, they did find the film's soundtrack album to be "a fun album with good lyrics and enjoyable compositions.".

References

External links
 Pesarattu at the Internet Movie Database

2010s Telugu-language films